A bazaar or souk, is a permanently enclosed marketplace or street where goods and services are exchanged or sold.

The term bazaar originates from the Persian word bāzār. The term bazaar is sometimes also used to refer to the "network of merchants, bankers and craftsmen" who work in that area. Although the word "bazaar" is of Persian origin, its use has spread and now has been accepted into the vernacular in countries around the world.

The term souk ( suq,  shuq, Syriac: ܫܘܩܐ shuqa,  shuka, Spanish: zoco, also spelled souq, shuk, shooq, soq, esouk, succ, suk, sooq, suq, soek) is used in Western Asian, North African and some Horn African cities.

List of Bazaars in India

References 

Bazaars
Retailing-related lists